A submarine sandwich, commonly known as a sub, hoagie (Philadelphia metropolitan area and Western Pennsylvania English), hero (New York City English), Italian (Maine English), grinder (New England English), wedge (Westchester, NY), or a spuckie (Boston English), is a type of American cold or hot sandwich made from a cylindrical bread roll split lengthwise and filled with meats, cheeses, vegetables, and condiments. It has many different names.

The terms submarine and sub are widespread in the US and not assignable to any certain part, though many of the localized terms are clustered in the northeastern United States.

History and etymology
The Italian sandwich originated in several different Italian American communities in the Northeastern United States from the late 19th to mid-20th centuries. The popularity of this Italian-American cuisine has grown from its origins in Connecticut, Pennsylvania, Delaware, Maryland, New York, New Jersey, Massachusetts, and Rhode Island to most parts of the United States and Canada, and with the advent of chain restaurants, is now available in many parts of the world. Sociologists Edwin Eames and Howard Robboy identified thirteen different terms for the submarine sandwich in the United States.

Submarine
The use of the term "submarine" or "sub" (after the resemblance of the roll to the shape of a submarine) is widespread in the United States and Canada. While some accounts source the name as originating in New London, Connecticut (site of the United States Navy's primary submarine base) during World War II, written advertisements from 1940 in Wilmington, Delaware, indicate the term originated prior to the United States's entry into World War II.

One theory says the submarine was brought to the U.S. by Dominic Conti (1874–1954), an Italian immigrant who came to New York in the late 19th century. He is said to have named it after seeing the recovered 1901 submarine called Fenian Ram in the Paterson Museum of New Jersey in 1928. His granddaughter has stated the following:

Party sub
Party sub is the name for a particularly long submarine sandwich, usually cut into pieces and served to guests at parties. The longest on record measured 735 meters (2,411 feet, 5 in).

Hoagie

The term hoagie originated in the Philadelphia area. In 1953, the Philadelphia Bulletin reported that Italians working at the World War I-era shipyard known as Hog Island, where emergency shipping was produced for the war effort, introduced the sandwich by putting various meats, cheeses, and lettuce between two slices of bread. This became known as the "Hog Island" sandwich; shortened to "Hoggies", then the "hoagie".

Dictionary.com offers the following origin of the term hoagie - n. American English (originally Philadelphia) word for "hero, large sandwich made from a long, split roll"; originally hoggie (c. 1936), traditionally said to be named for Big Band songwriter Hoagland Howard "Hoagy" Carmichael (1899–1981), but the use of the word predates his celebrity and the original spelling seems to suggest another source (perhaps "hog"). Modern spelling is c. 1945, and may have been altered by influence of Carmichael's nickname.

The Philadelphia Almanac and Citizen's Manual offers a different explanation, that the sandwich was created by early-twentieth-century street vendors called "hokey-pokey men", who sold antipasto salad, meats, cookies and buns with a cut in them. When Gilbert and Sullivan's operetta H.M.S. Pinafore opened in Philadelphia in 1879, bakeries produced a long loaf called the pinafore. Entrepreneurial "hokey-pokey men" sliced the loaf in half, stuffed it with antipasto salad, and sold the world's first "hoagie".

Another explanation is that the word hoagie arose in the late 19th to early 20th centuries, among the Italian community in South Philadelphia, when "on the hoke" meant that someone was destitute. Deli owners would give away scraps of cheeses and meats in an Italian bread-roll known as a "hokie", but the Italian immigrants pronounced it "hoagie".

Yet another possible origin of the term, as conveyed by Howard Robboy, is that a man in Philadelphia, Alphonso DePalma, who later opened a sandwich shop there, claimed to have stated in 1928 "You have to be a hog to eat one of those."

Shortly after World War II, there were numerous varieties of the term in use throughout Philadelphia. By the 1940s, the spelling "hoagie" had come to dominate less-used variations like "hoogie" and "hoggie".  It is never spelled hoagy. By 1955, restaurants throughout the area were using the term hoagie. Listings in Pittsburgh show hoagies arriving in 1961 and becoming widespread in that city by 1966.

Former Philadelphia mayor (and later Pennsylvania governor) Ed Rendell declared the hoagie the "Official Sandwich of Philadelphia". However, there are claims that the hoagie was actually a product of nearby Chester. DiCostanza's in Boothwyn claims that the mother of DiConstanza's owner originated the hoagie in 1925 in Chester. DiCostanza relates the story that a customer came into the family deli and through an exchange matching the customer's requests and the deli's offerings, the hoagie was created.

Woolworth's to-go sandwich was called a hoagie in all U.S. stores.

Bánh mì sandwiches are sometimes referred to as "Vietnamese hoagies" in Philadelphia.

Hero

The New York term hero is first attested in 1937. The name is sometimes credited to the New York Herald Tribune food writer Clementine Paddleford in the 1930s, but there is no good evidence for this. It is also sometimes claimed that it is related to the gyro, but this is unlikely as the gyro was unknown in the United States until the 1960s.

Hero (plural usually , not heroes) remains the prevailing New York City term for most sandwiches on an oblong roll with a generally Italian flavor, in addition to the original described above. Pizzeria menus often include eggplant parmigiana, chicken parmigiana, and meatball , each served with sauce.

Grinder

A common term in New England, especially Connecticut and Western Massachusetts, is grinder, but its origin has several possibilities. One theory has the name coming from Italian-American slang for a dock worker, among whom the sandwich was popular. Others say that it was called a grinder because the bread's hard crust required much chewing.

In Pennsylvania, New York, and parts of New England, the term grinder usually refers to a hot submarine sandwich (meatball, sausage, etc.), whereas a cold sandwich (e.g., cold cuts) is usually called a "sub". In the Philadelphia area, the term grinder is also applied to any hoagie that is toasted in the oven after assembly, whether or not it is made with traditionally hot ingredients.

Italian 
The term "Italian sandwich" or simply "Italian" is used in Maine. Local folklore claims that a baker named Giovanni Amato invented the Italian in 1899.

The traditional Maine Italian sandwich is prepared using a long, soft bread roll or bun with meats such as salami, mortadella, capocollo or ham along with provolone, tomato, onion, green bell pepper, Greek olives, pickles, olive oil or salad oil, salt and cracked black pepper. Additional ingredients, such as pepperoni, banana pepper, or lettuce may be added to the sandwich. The sandwich is often cut in half to make it easier to handle.

Wedge
The term wedge is used in the New York counties of Dutchess, Putnam, and Westchester, as well as the Connecticut county of Fairfield – four counties directly north of New York City.

Some base the name wedge on a diagonal cut in the middle of the sandwich, creating two halves or "wedges", or a "wedge" cut out of the top half of the bread with the fillings "wedged" in between, or a sandwich that is served between two "wedges" of bread. It has also been said wedge is just short for "sandwich", with the name having originated from an Italian deli owner located in Yonkers, who got tired of saying the whole word.

Spukie
The term spukie ("spukkie" or "spuckie") is unique to the city of Boston and derives from the Italian word spuccadella, meaning "long roll". The word spuccadella is not typically found in Italian dictionaries, which may suggest that it could be a regional Italian dialect, or possibly a Boston Italian-American innovation. Spukie is typically heard in parts of Dorchester and South Boston. Some bakeries in Boston's North End neighborhood have homemade spuccadellas for sale.

Other names

 Blimpie (shaped like a blimp) – from the Hoboken, New Jersey–founded chain, Blimpie
 Gatsby – Cape Town, South Africa
 Po' boy – Louisiana
 Cosmo – Williamsport, Pennsylvania 
 Zeppelin or Zep – eastern Pennsylvania
Smoske – Belgium
Dagobert – Belgium
 Continental roll ('Conti roll') - Western Australia
 Torpedo Sandwich

Popularity and availability
Rolls filled with condiments have been common in several European countries for more than a century, notably in France and Scotland.

In the United States, from its origins with the Italian-American labor force in the northeast, the sub began to show up on menus of local pizzerias. As time went on and popularity grew, small restaurants, called hoagie shops and sub shops, that specialized in the sandwich began to open.

Subs or their national equivalents were already popular in many European, Asian, and Australasian countries when late 20th-century franchisee chain restaurants (such as Subway) and fast food made them even more popular and increased the prevalence of the word sub. Many outlets offer non-traditional ingredient combinations.

In the United States, there are many chain restaurants that specialize in subs. Major international chains include Firehouse Subs, Quiznos, Mr. Sub, Jimmy John's, and the largest restaurant chain in the world, Subway. The sandwich is also often available at supermarkets, local delis, and convenience stores. These include Wawa, which annually runs a sub promotional event during the summer called Hoagiefest, and Publix, whose sandwiches are often referred to as "pub subs".

See also

 Bánh mì
 Cuban sandwich
 Dagwood sandwich
 French dip
 List of American sandwiches
 List of regional dishes of the United States
 List of sandwiches
 List of submarine sandwich restaurants
 Muffuletta
 Panini

References

External links
 Map of regional variation of the word for a submarine sandwich using data from Bert Vaux's online survey of English dialects (see question 64)

American sandwiches
Cuisine of Philadelphia
Italian-American cuisine
New England cuisine
Culture of New York City
Italian-American culture in New York City
Cuisine of New York City